The S7 is a regional railway service of the Zürich S-Bahn on the ZVV (Zürich transportation network) and is one of the network's trunk services.

Route 
 

The service links Winterthur, in the northeast of the canton of Zürich, and Rapperswil-Jona, on the on north shore of Lake Zürich but just over the cantonal boundary in the canton of St. Gallen. From Winterthur, the service runs over the main Zurich–Winterthur railway line to Effretikon, but then takes the secondary route via Kloten to Zürich Oerlikon, from where it proceeds through Zürich via Zürich Hauptbahnhof and Zürich Stadelhofen. From Stadelhofen, trains then run over the Lake Zürich right-bank railway line to Rapperswil. Between Stadelhofen and Meilen trains run non-stop, with a parallel stopping service provided by lines S6 and S16.

The following stations are served:

 Winterthur Hauptbahnhof
 Kemptthal
 Effretikon
 Bassersdorf
 Kloten
 Kloten Balsberg
 Opfikon
 Zürich Oerlikon
 Zürich Hardbrücke
 Zürich Hauptbahnhof
 Zürich Stadelhofen
 Meilen
 Uetikon
 Männedorf
 Stäfa
 Uerikon
 Feldbach
 Kempraten
 Rapperswil

Rolling stock 

 services are operated by RABe 511 EMUs or Re 450 locomotives push-pulling double-deck coaches. RABe 514 ("DTZ") EMUs were used previously.

Scheduling 
The normal frequency is one train every 30 minutes. A journey over the full length of the service takes 74 minutes.

See also 

 Rail transport in Switzerland
 Trams in Zürich

References

External links 
 
 ZVV official website: Routes & zones

Zürich S-Bahn lines
Transport in the canton of St. Gallen
Transport in the canton of Zürich